Brachygalea is a genus of moths of the family Noctuidae.

Species
 Brachygalea albolineata (Blachier, 1905)
 Brachygalea kalchbergi (Staudinger, 1892)

References
 Brachygalea  at Markku Savela's Lepidoptera and Some Other Life Forms
 Natural History Museum Lepidoptera genus database

Cuculliinae